Empress Xiaoshencheng (5 July 1792 – 16 June 1833), of the Manchu Bordered Yellow Banner Tunggiya clan, was a posthumous name bestowed to the wife and first empress consort of Mianning, the Daoguang Emperor. She was empress consort of Qing from 1822 until her death in 1833.

Life

Family background
Empress Xiaoshencheng's personal name was not recorded in history.

 Father: Shuming'a, served as the Magistrate of Yong'an from 1771 to 1772 and the Magistrate of Xin'an from 1776 to 1777, and held the title of a first class duke

Qianlong era
The future Empress Xiaoshencheng was born on the 17th day of the fifth lunar month in the 57th year of the reign of the Qianlong Emperor, which translates to 5 July 1792 in the Gregorian calendar.

Jiaqing era
On 2 February 1809, Lady Tunggiya married Minning, the second son of the Jiaqing Emperor, and became his second primary consort. On 29 July 1813, she gave birth to his first daughter, Princess Duanmin of the First Rank, who would die prematurely on 7 December 1819.

Daoguang era
The Jiaqing Emperor died on 2 September 1820 and was succeeded by Minning, who was enthroned as the Daoguang Emperor. On 28 December 1822, Lady Tunggiya, as the emperor's primary consort, was instated as Empress. As Empress, Lady Tunggiya was placed in charge of the emperor's harem. She died on 16 June 1833 and was interred in the Mu Mausoleum of the Western Qing tombs.

Titles
 During the reign of the Qianlong Emperor (r. 1735–1796):
 Lady Tunggiya (from 5 July 1792)
 During the reign of the Jiaqing Emperor (r. 1796–1820):
 Primary consort (from 2 February 1809)
 During the reign of the Daoguang Emperor (r. 1820–1850):
 Empress (from 28 December 1822)
 Empress Xiaoshen (from 7 September 1833)
 During the reign of the Xianfeng Emperor (r. 1850–1861):
 Empress Xiaoshencheng (from 26 October 1850)

Issue
 As primary consort:
 Princess Duanmin of the First Rank (29 July 1813 – 7 December 1819), the Daoguang Emperor's first daughter (Primary Consort Tunggiya was 19 at the birth)

Gallery

In fiction and popular culture
 Portrayed by Wong Man-ching in The Rise and Fall of Qing Dynasty (1988)
 Portrayed by Myolie Wu in Curse of the Royal Harem (2011)

See also
 Ranks of imperial consorts in China#Qing
 Royal and noble ranks of the Qing dynasty

Notes

References
 
 
 

1792 births
1833 deaths
Xiaoshencheng, Empress
Xiaoshencheng, Empress
Xiaoshencheng, Empress
19th-century Chinese women
19th-century Chinese people